Pääkkönenite is a metallic grey mineral with the molecular formula Sb2AsS2. It is named after Veikko Pääkkönen (1907–1980), a Finnish geologist.

References 

Antimony minerals
Arsenic minerals
Sulfide minerals
Monoclinic minerals
Minerals in space group 12